The Hölloch is a  long cave in the municipality Muotathal in Switzerland. The Hölloch is an example of a karst cave system.

Exploration 
The cave was first scientifically explored in 1875 by a group led by Alois Ulrich. Later expeditions in the 1950s by Alfred Bögli, one of the pioneers of speleology, managed to explore a large part of the cave. 

It was the first cave in the world where the explored length reached 100 km, and until the linkage of the Flint Ridge Cave System to the Mammoth Cave System in 1972, it was believed to be the largest cave system in the world.

Tourism 
A portion of the cave near the entrance is open to visitors, but the remainder is restricted to qualified cavers owing to its enormous size.

See also
List of longest caves

References

External links 

 Hoelloch Cave Research Association

Caves of Switzerland